Anders Steen (born April 28, 1955) is a retired professional ice hockey player who played 42 games in the National Hockey League.  He played for the Winnipeg Jets. He is currently a scout for the Calgary Flames.

Career statistics

Regular season and playoffs

International

References

External links 

1955 births
Living people
Calgary Flames scouts
Indianapolis Racers draft picks
People from Nyköping Municipality
St. Louis Blues scouts
Swedish expatriate ice hockey players in Canada
Swedish ice hockey centres
Undrafted National Hockey League players
Winnipeg Jets (1979–1996) players
Sportspeople from Södermanland County